Liolaemus lineomaculatus, the decorated tree iguana, is a species of lizard in the family Iguanidae.  It is found in Chile and Argentina.

References

lineomaculatus
Lizards of South America
Reptiles of Chile
Reptiles described in 1885
Taxa named by George Albert Boulenger